Thomas Moore (1844 – 23 July 1935) was a New Zealand cricketer. He played in six first-class matches for Canterbury from 1866 to 1875.

See also
 List of Canterbury representative cricketers

References

External links
 

1844 births
1935 deaths
New Zealand cricketers
Canterbury cricketers